N,N-Diethyl-meta-toluamide, also called DEET or diethyltoluamide, is the most common active ingredient in insect repellents. It is a slightly yellow oil intended to be applied to the skin or to clothing and provides protection against mosquitoes, flies, ticks, fleas, chiggers, leeches and many biting insects.

History
DEET was developed in 1944 by Samuel Gertler of the United States Department of Agriculture for use by the United States Army, following its experience of jungle warfare during World War II. It was originally tested as a pesticide on farm fields, and entered military use in 1946 and civilian use in 1957. It was used in Vietnam and Southeast Asia.

In its original form, known as "bug juice", the application solution was composed of 75% DEET and 25% ethanol. Later, a new version of the repellent was developed by the U.S. Army and the USDA. This formulation consisted of DEET and a mixture of polymers that extended its release and reduced its evaporation rate. This extended-release application was registered by the Environmental Protection Agency in 1991.

Preparation
A slightly yellow liquid at room temperature, it can be prepared by converting m-toluic acid (3-methylbenzoic acid) to the corresponding acyl chloride using thionyl chloride (SOCl2), and then allowing that product to react with diethylamine:

Mechanism and effectiveness
DEET is an extremely effective insect repellant, the most effective available. It is effective against a variety of invertebrates, including ticks, flies, mosquitos, and some parasitic worms. DEET is suspected to affect two pathways in mosquitos: it affects odorant receptors at a distance, and it affects chemoreceptors upon contact. The exact mechanisms are still being researched, but the two most likely hypotheses are the "smell and avoid hypothesis" (that DEET has an unpleasant odor to insects), and the "confusant hypothesis" (that smelling DEET confuses insects).

Concentrations
The concentration of DEET in products may range from less than 10 percent to nearly 100 percent. Concentrations of 10 to 30 percent are recommended for infants and children. DEET should not be used on children under 2 months of age.

DEET is often sold and used in spray or lotion in concentrations up to 100%. Consumer Reports found a direct correlation between DEET concentration and hours of protection against insect bites. 100% DEET was found to offer up to 12 hours of protection while several lower concentration DEET formulations (20–34%) offered 3–6 hours of protection. Other research has corroborated the effectiveness of DEET. The Centers for Disease Control and Prevention recommends 30–50% DEET to prevent the spread of pathogens carried by insects.

A 2008 study found that higher concentrations of DEET have an improved ability to repel insects through fabric.

Effects on health
As a precaution, manufacturers advise that DEET products should not be used under clothing or on damaged skin, and that preparations be washed off after they are no longer needed or between applications. DEET can act as an irritant; in rare cases, it may cause severe epidermal reactions. Other symptoms that can occur are breathing difficulty, burning eyes, or headaches.

The authors of a 2002 study published in The New England Journal of Medicine wrote:
... this repellent has been subjected to more scientific and toxicologic scrutiny than any other repellent substance. ... DEET has a remarkable safety profile after 40 years of use and nearly 8 billion human applications. Fewer than 50 cases of serious toxic effects have been documented in ... medical literature since 1960 ... Many of these cases of toxic effects involved long-term, heavy, frequent, or whole-body application of DEET. No correlation has been found between the concentration of DEET used and the risk of toxic effects. ... When applied with common sense, DEET-based repellents can be expected to provide a safe as well as a long-lasting repellent effect ... under circumstances in which it is crucial to be protected against arthropod bites that might transmit disease.

When DEET is used in combination with insecticides for cockroaches it can strengthen the toxicity of carbamate, an acetylcholinesterase inhibitor. These 1996 findings indicate that DEET has neurological effects on insects in addition to known olfactory effects, and that its toxicity is strengthened in combination with other insecticides.

In the DEET Reregistration Eligibility Decision (RED) in 1998, the United States Environmental Protection Agency (EPA) reported 14 to 46 cases of potential DEET-associated seizures, including four deaths. The EPA states: "... it does appear that some cases are likely related to DEET toxicity," which may underreport the risk as physicians may fail to check for history of DEET use or fail to report cases of seizure subsequent to DEET use.

In 1997, the Pesticide Information Project of Cooperative Extension Offices of Cornell University stated that "Everglades National Park employees having extensive DEET exposure were more likely to have insomnia, mood disturbances and impaired cognitive function than lesser exposed co-workers".

When used as directed, products containing between 10% and 30% DEET have been found by the American Academy of Pediatrics to be safe to use on children, as well as adults, but the Academy recommends that DEET not be used on infants less than two months old.

Citing human health reasons, Health Canada barred the sale of insect repellents for human use that contained more than 30% DEET in a 2002 re-evaluation "based on a human health risk assessment that considered daily application of DEET over a prolonged period of time". The agency recommended that DEET-based products be used on children between the ages of 2 and 12 only if the concentration of DEET is 10% or less and that repellents be applied no more than 3 times a day, children under 2 should not receive more than 1 application of repellent in a day and DEET-based products of any concentration should not be used on infants under 6 months. Some experts recommend against applying DEET and sunscreen simultaneously since that would increase DEET penetration; Xiaochen Gu, a professor at the University of Manitoba’s faculty of Pharmacy who led a study about mosquitos, advises that DEET should be applied 30 or more minutes later.

A 2020 study performed by students within the University of Florida's College of Public Health and Health Professions analyzed data from the National Health and Nutrition Examination Survey and identified 1,205 participants who had "DEET metabolic levels recorded at or above detection limits". They analyzed biomarkers related to systemic inflammation, immune, liver, and kidney functions, and found no "evidence that DEET exposure has any impact on the biomarkers identified."

Detection in body fluids 
DEET may be measured in blood, plasma, or urine by gas or liquid chromatography-mass spectrometry to confirm a diagnosis of poisoning in hospitalized patients or to provide evidence in a medicolegal death investigation. Blood or plasma DEET concentrations are expected to be in a range of 0.3–3.0 mg/L during the first 8 hours after dermal application in persons using the chemical appropriately, >6 mg/L in intoxicated patients and >100 mg/L in victims of acute intentional oral overdose.

Effects on materials
DEET is an effective solvent, and may dissolve some watch crystals, plastics, rayon, spandex, other synthetic fabrics, and painted or varnished surfaces including nail polish. It also may act as a plasticizer by remaining inside some formerly hard plastics, leaving them softened and more flexible. DEET is incompatible with rayon, acetate, or dynel clothing.

Effects on the environment
Though DEET is not expected to bioaccumulate, it has been found to have a slight toxicity for fresh-water fish such as rainbow trout and tilapia, and it also has been shown to be toxic for some species of freshwater zooplankton. DEET has been detected at low concentrations in water bodies as a result of production and use, such as in the Mississippi River and its tributaries, where a 1991 study detected levels varying from 5 to 201 ng/L.

A 1975 study analyzed the effects of DEET on communities of freshwater organisms native to Chinese waterways and found that compared to other commercial insect repellants, DEET was moderately toxic to aquatic organisms. The most-at-risk organisms were algae colonies which often experienced "significant biomass decline and community composition shift[s]" when exposed to DEET at 500 ng/L.

See also 
 Beautyberry
 Citronella oil
 DDT, another means of disease vector control
 Icaridin
 Lemon eucalyptus
 Mosquito coil
 p-Menthane-3,8-diol
 Permethrin, a pyrethroid
 SS220
 Anthranilate-based insect repellents

References

Further reading

External links 

 DEET General Fact Sheet - National Pesticide Information Center
 DEET Technical Fact Sheet – National Pesticide Information Center
 West Nile Virus Resource Guide – National Pesticide Information Center
 Health Advisory: Tick and Insect Repellents, New York State
 US Centers for Disease Control information on DEET
 US Environmental Protection Agency information on DEET
 Review of scientific literature on DEET  (from a RAND Corporation report on Gulf War illnesses)
 Health Canada - Re-evaluation Decision Document: Personal insect repellents containing DEET (N,N-diethyl-m-toluamide and related compounds), 2002

Household chemicals
Insect repellents
Benzamides
3-Tolyl compounds